"You Are the Reason" is a 2017 song by Calum Scott.

You Are the Reason may refer to:

 "You Are the Reason", a song by Air Supply from Yours Truly, 2001
 "You Are the Reason", a song by Katrine Lukins, competing to represent Latvia in the Eurovision Song Contest 2014

See also
 You're the Reason (disambiguation)